Bahador (also Romanized as Bahādor) is a village in Ujan-e Gharbi Rural District, in the Central District of Bostanabad County, East Azerbaijan Province, Iran. At the 2006 census, its population was 41, in 8 families.

References 

Populated places in Bostanabad County